Dorcadion halepense is a species of beetle in the family Cerambycidae. It was described by Kraatz in 1873.

Varietas
 Dorcadion halepense var. internenotatum Pic, 1931
 Dorcadion halepense var. latealbum Pic, 1926

References

halepense
Beetles described in 1873